Tikka (pronounced [ʈɪkkaː]) is a dish consisting of pieces of meat or vegetarian alternatives, with its origins tracing back to the Mughal Empire. It is made by marinating the pieces in spices and yogurt, and cooking them in a tandoor. Tikka is popular throughout the Indian subcontinent and also in countries such as Great Britain. The preservation of paneer tikka can be enhanced by using vacuum packaging.

Etymology
Tikka is a Chaghatai word which has been commonly combined with the Hindi-Urdu word masala—itself derived from Arabic— with the combined word originating from UK English. The Chaghatai word Tikka itself is a derivation of the Common Turkic word tikkü, which means "piece" or "chunk".

Origin
The precise origin of the dish is uncertain. Recipes for cooked meat enriched with spices and mixed within a sauce date back to 1700 BCE found on cuneiform tablets near Babylon, credited to the Sumerians. During the Mughal dynasty, the Mughals brought "boneless pieces of cooked meat" called Tikka to India.

There are different varieties of the dish, both meat inclusive and vegetarian. Generally, the dish is defined as "an Indian dish of small pieces of meat or vegetables marinated in a spice mixture".

Preparation
Tikka consists of boneless pieces of meat or vegetarian alternatives such as paneer, which are marinated in spices and yogurt and subsequently strung through a skewer to be cooked. It is generally cooked in a tandoor and served dry.

Variations

Indian-subcontinent variations
The Indian variations of Tikka are the roots of the Western variations, including Chicken tikka and Paneer tikka, which are generally served dry.

Cross-cultural variations 
Regular chicken and paneer tikka have been combined with dishes from other cultures such as Mexican cuisine to create hybrid dishes such as Tikka Masala Burritos, which are served with either chicken or paneer as their main ingredient.

Popularity

In Britain 
A study was undertaken in the 1990s that revealed British interest in foreign food, with chicken tikka being a favourite filling in the British Rail sandwich.

In India 
A study of 670 foreign tourists at Indira Gandhi International Airport, New Delhi, attempted to show the street food preferences of foreign tourists in the city, along with the reason for their selection. Of the 17 most preferred street foods, chicken tikka was the most favoured, with tourists preferring mildly flavoured foods that are hygienically prepared.

During the cricket World Cup in 2018, restaurants in the host city served dishes named after cricket players using cricket terminology. For instance, paneer tikka was renamed Dhoni da Tikka after former Indian cricket captain Mahendra Singh Dhoni and chicken tikka was renamed Virat's Straight Drive after Indian cricket captain Virat Kohli.

Preservation and quality

Paneer tikka 
Paneer tikka has a shelf-life of 1–2 days, which can be increased up to 28 days using modified atmosphere packaging (MAP) technology. Vacuum packaging is most effective as it is able to limit chemical changes during storage, increasing the refrigerated shelf-life of paneer tikka to 40 days.

References 

Indian cuisine
Pakistani cuisine
Punjabi cuisine
Bengali cuisine
Bangladeshi cuisine
Iraqi cuisine
Appetizers
Cheese dishes
Indian cuisine in the United Kingdom
Pakistani cuisine in the United Kingdom